This is a list of current commando units.

Argentina 
601 Commando Company
602 Commando Company
603 Commando Company

Australia 

1st Commando Regiment
2nd Commando Regiment

Bahamas

Bangladesh 

Para-Commando Brigade

Belgium 
2nd Commando Battalion
3rd Parachute Battalion (Belgium)

Brazil 
Special Operations Command
COMANF
GRUMEC
Para-SAR
COT

Canada  
Canadian Special Operations Forces Command
Canadian Special Operations Regiment
Royal Canadian Navy
Naval Tactical Operations Group

China 
 Beijing Military Region-"Oriental Sword" belongs to the Beijing Military Region. All 3000 soldiers in the force complete all types of operations.
 Guangzhou Military Region Special Forces Unit – "South Blade" or "South China Sword" established in 1988 as the People's Liberation Army's first special reconnaissance group, and was later expanded in 2000 to become the first PLA special operations unit to be capable of air-, sea-, and land-operations similar to the U.S. Navy SEALs.
 Chengdu Military Region Special Forces Unit – "Falcon". Established in 1992, this unit is specialised in target locating and indicating, airborne insertion, sabotage and offensive strike, and emergency evacuation. 
 Beijing Military Region Special Forces Unit – "Arrow". Established in the early 1990s, this unit is equipped with various "high-tech" equipment including unmanned aerial reconnaissance vehicle (UARV), individual explosion devices and handheld laser dazzling weapons.
 Shenyang Military Region Special Forces Unit – "Siberian Tiger" is capable of completing missions on the ground and in the air and water, as well as surviving in the wilderness alone or in small groups.
 Nanjing Military Region Special Forces Unit – Nickname "Flying Dragon" is the special land force of east China's Nanjing Military Region.
 Nanjing Military Region Special Forces Unit – "Oscar"
 Lanzhou Military Region Special Forces Unit – "Night Tiger" has a long and illustrious history with its origins dating back to World War II. It is home of China's first counter-terrorism unit, established in 2000.
 Jinan Military Region Special Forces Unit – "Eagle" Soldiers of the Eagle special force can complete sea-air-land operations also similar to the U.S. Navy SEALs
 Thor (Leishen) Commando Airborne Forces is a crack special force for reconnaissance operations of the PLA's airborne troops, which is capable of performing the tasks of strategic deterrence, combat assault, task operations under IT-based conditions.
 PLA Navy's commando team "Sea Dragon" soldiers are equipped with black uniforms, this unit's first publicly known mission was to accompany three Chinese warships in protecting and escorting commercial ships against Somali pirates in December 2008, in cooperation with other nations as part of a UN mandate. Since then, the unit has participated in anti-piracy missions in the Gulf of Eden for over 300 days.
 Leopard is the name given to the crack troops of the Southwest China Falcon special force.

Colombia

Air Force 
Special Air Command Group (Agrupación de Comandos Especiales Aéreos)

France 
In France, commando is both the name of Special Operations or Special Operations Capable units and the name of an elite light infantry training. 

French Army (Armée de Terre)
The commandos are trained at the Centre national d'entraînement commando or National Commando Training Center. The graduates of the Center are either serving in a SF unit (1er RPIMa and 13e RDP), in a light-infantry unit (Commando Parachute Group in the 11th Parachute Brigade and Mountain Commando Group in the 27th Mountain Infantry Brigade) or as instructors in a regular Army unit. Furthermore, members of the counter-terrorist National Gendarmerie Intervention Group and of the Division Action of Directorate-General for External Security are usually graduates of the Center. The National Center has three courses of training, commonly called levels : Training, Instructor and Senior Instructor. In order to qualify for a senior course, the candidate must have graduated the junior one(s) with outstanding results.

French Navy (Marine Nationale)
The Commandos Marine are the Navy component of Special Operations Command. They draw their personnel from the Navy Infantry (Fusiliers Marins) and have their own training pipeline, but they can also train at the Army Training Center.
Commando Hubert : (also named Commando d'Action Sous-Marine Hubert, CASM, "underwater operations commando"): Submarine action (combat divers).
Commando Jaubert : Assault at sea, exfiltration, close quarters battle at sea.
Commando Trepel : Assault at sea, exfiltration.
Commando de Penfentenyo : Reconnaissance, Intelligence Operations (recon swimmers)
Commando de Montfort : Long range neutralisation (missile launchers, light mortars, heavy sniper rifles), fire support designation
Commando Kieffer : C3I, military dogs
French Air Force (Armée de L'Air).
The Parachute Commandos (commandos parachutistes) are the élite units of the Air Force Infantry (Fusiliers Commandos de l'Air). They have their own training pipeline, but they can also train at the Army Training Center
Commando parachutiste de l'Air n° 10 (CPA 10) is the Air Force component of Special Operations Command
 Commando parachutiste de l'Air n° 20 : long-range Bases Protection and JTACs.
Commando parachutiste de l'Air n° 20 : RESCO

Germany 

The German Army currently operates the Fernspähkompanie (Germany's elite long range reconnaissance company), and the Kommando Spezialkräfte (KSK).

The KSK is stationed in Calw, in the Black Forest area in southern Germany. It consists of about 1,100 soldiers, but only a nucleus of these are in fighting units. Exact numbers are not available, as this information is considered secret. The KSK is a part of the Special Operations Division (Div. Spezielle Operationen or DSO).

The fighting units are divided into four commando companies of about 100 men each and the special commando company with veteran members, taking supporting tasks. Each of the four commando companies has five specialised platoons:

 1st platoon: land insertions
 2nd platoon: airborne operations
 3rd platoon: amphibious operations
 4th platoon: operations in special geographic or meteorologic surroundings (e.g. mountains or polar-regions)
 5th platoon: reconnaissance, sniper and counter-sniper operations
 Command Platoon

There are four commando squads in every platoon. Each of these groups consists of about four equally skilled soldiers. One of each group is specially trained as weapons expert, medic, combat engineer or communications expert respectively. Additionally a group can contain other specialists, e.g. heavy weapons or language experts.

Another special unit, the Kampfschwimmer (comparable to the USN SEALs) are operated by the German Navy.

India 

Army

1st Battalion (Special Forces)
2nd Battalion (Special Forces)
3rd Battalion (Special Forces)
4th Battalion (Special Forces)
5th Battalion (Airborne Battalion)
6th Battalion (Airborne Battalion)
7th Battalion (Airborne Battalion)
9th Battalion (Special Forces)
10th Battalion (Special Forces)
11th Battalion (Special Forces)
12th Battalion (Special Forces)
13th Battalion (Special Forces)
21st Battalion (Special Forces)
23rd Battalion (Airborne Battalion)
29th Battalion (Airborne Battalion)
31st Battalion (Rashtriya Rifles)

Ghatak Commandos are tactical level special Operations capable commando units attached to each battalion of the army. 

Air Force

Navy

Indonesia

Army

Navy

Iran

Revolutionary Guards 

In the Islamic Revolutionary Guard Corps (IRGC), one of its five branches, the elite Quds Force specialises in extraterritorial operations.
In the Ground Forces, the Saberin Battalion is the most famous special unit. The Islamic Revolutionary Guards Corps Navy has its own Special Units of marines.

Army 

Ground Forces of Islamic Republic of Iran Army units whose members are trained at Lashkarak Takavar Training Centre:
 23rd Takavar Division based in Parandak
 58th Takavar Division (Zolfaghar Division) based in Shahroud
 25th Takavar Brigade based in Pasveh
 35th Takavar Brigade based in Kermanshah
 45th Takavar Brigade based in Shushtar
 55th Airborne Brigade based in Shiraz
 65th Airborne Special Forces Brigade (NOHED Brigade) based in Tehran. Mashregh News considers the unit one of the top ten commando units in the world.
Islamic Republic of Iran Navy green berets/marines whose members are trained at Manjil Takavar Training Centre:
 1st Marine Brigade (Imam Hossein Brigade) based in Bandar Abbas
 2nd Marine Brigade  (Hazrat Rasul-i-Akram Brigade) based in Bushehr
 3rd Marine Brigade (Hamza Sayyid-ush-Shuhda Brigade) based in Konarak
During the reign of the last Shah (king) of Iran, much of the naval training was created by members of the Soviet Union's Spetsnaz and the British Special Boat Service. Training is at least a 12-month process. After the recruit has demonstrated the minimum physical requirements, he is sent to a collection of schools.

Iraq

On 31 August 2016, Clarksville Online reported U.S. soldiers from the 1st Battalion, 502nd Infantry Regiment, Task Force Strike, 101st Airborne Division (Air Assault), took charge of a Ranger training program for qualified volunteers from Iraqi security forces at Camp Taji, Iraq. The Ranger training program, led by Company A, 1-502nd, is designed to lay the foundation for an elite Iraqi unit.

Israel 

The primary commando units of the Israel Defense Forces include Shayetet 13, Sayeret Matkal and the Shaldag Unit.

Shayetet 13 is the elite naval commando unit of the Israeli Navy. S'13 specializes in sea-to-land incursions, counter-terrorism, sabotage, maritime intelligence gathering, maritime hostage rescue, and boarding. The unit is respected as among the best of the world's special forces.

Sayeret Matkal (General Staff Reconnaissance Unit) is a special forces unit of the Israel Defense Forces (IDF) directly subordinate to the Directorate of Military Intelligence.

Primarily a field intelligence-gathering unit specializing in special reconnaissance behind enemy lines, Sayeret Matkal is also tasked with counter-terrorism, hostage rescue, and foreign espionage. Modeled after the British Army's Special Air Service—from which it emulated the motto, "Who Dares, Wins"—the unit is considered to be the Israeli equivalent to the famed Delta Force of the United States.

As one of Israel's most elite commando units, Sayeret Matkal has reputedly been involved in almost every major counter-terrorism operation since its inception in 1957.

The Egoz Reconnaissance Unit is an Israeli Special Force commando unit, in the Israel Defense Forces (IDF). Egoz is a unit that specializes in guerrilla, anti-guerrilla warfare, behind enemy lines intelligence gathering, and more complicated ground activity. Egoz is part of the Commando Brigade but still completes basic training with the Golani Brigade.

Maglan (Also known as Unit 212) is an Israeli special forces unit which specializes in operating behind enemy lines and deep in enemy territory using advanced technologies and weaponry.

Unit 217, frequently called Duvdevan Unit is an elite special operations force within the Israel Defense Forces, part of the Oz Brigade. Duvdevan are noted for undercover operations in urban areas, during which they often wear Arab civilian clothes as a disguise. They are also known to be trained in human and mechanical counter-surveillance. Along with Sayeret Matkal, soldiers in Duvdevan are the only soldiers in the IDF authorized to wear their uniforms without identifying shoulder tabs.

Shaldag Unit, also known as Unit 5101, is an elite Israeli Air Force commando unit. Shaldag's mission is to deploy undetected into combat and hostile environments to conduct special reconnaissance, establish assault zones or airfields, while simultaneously conducting air traffic control and commando actions.

Israel's premier commando unit of the Haganah, the forerunner of the modern IDF, was the Palmach.

Italy

Kenya
Special Operations Regiment (Kenya)
40th Rangers Strike Force

Malaysia
Grup Gerak Khas (GGK)
PASKAL (Pasukan Khas Laut)
PASKAU (Pasukan Khas Udara)
69 Commando (VAT69)
Special Task and Rescue (STAR)

Malta 
C Company of 1st Regiment

Netherlands 
Korps Commando Troepen

New Zealand
 D Squadron (Commando), 1st New Zealand Special Air Service Regiment

Pakistan 

 Special Service Group (SSG) is a commando and special operations division of the Pakistan Army. 
 Special Service Group Navy (SSGN) is a smaller Pakistan Navy equivalent to SSG.
 Light Commando Battalions have been formed by the Pakistan Army for special operations and counter-terrorism.

Philippines

The Special Action Force (SAF) is the elite commando unit of the Philippine National Police. It is required to undergo the SAF Commando Course to be allowed to wear the SAF Beret. It also serves as the foundation course or requisite for other SAF specialization trainings such as Explosives and Ordnance Disposal (EOD), Basic Airborne Course (BAC), Urban Counter Revolutionary Warfare Course (SURESHOCK), SCUBA-BUSROC (Basic Under-Water Search and Rescue Operations Course), SAF Seaborne Warfare Course (SSWC) and others.

SAF Commandos have received training from the Federal Bureau of Investigation (FBI) Hostage Rescue Team (HRT) and Critical Incident Response Group (CIRG), RAID and Yamam. The Anti-Terrorist Unit (ATU) of the PNP-SAF is responsible for police counter-terrorism (CT) operations nationwide.

Portugal 

The Portuguese Armed Forces, currently, includes the following commando type forces: the Comandos Troops, the Parachute Troops, the Corpo de Fuzileiros.

The first modern commando type force created by the Portuguese Army was the Sapadores de Assalto (Assault Sappers), a small assault sub-unit organized inside the Army School of Engineers, by the then captain Kaulza de Arriaga, in 1947. However, the majority of the Army was opposed to the existence of special forces and the Sapadores de Assalto were soon extinct.

Later, Kaulza de Arriaga, would be appointed the first Secretary of the Air and – in this role – created the Portuguese Parachute Troops in 1956, with commando features, as part of the Portuguese Air Force and not of the Army.

In 1960, the Army created again a commando type unit, the Caçadores Especiais (Special Rifles). The Caçadores Especiais would fight in the beginning of the Portuguese Overseas War in Africa. However, the Army faction opposed to the existence of special forces prevailed again and the decision was taken to extinct the Caçadores Especiais and to extend the training given to those units to all the field units of the Army.

It was soon found impossible to train all units as Caçadores Especiais. This originated the creation of the Comandos. The first of these forces were created in Northern Angola in 1962, initially as shock sub-units of regular field battalions and later as independent units. The Comandos were designed to conduct special actions in the Portuguese territory or abroad, to fight as assault infantry / shock troops and to provide the high political and military commands with a force able to conduct irregular operations.

Beyond the above-mentioned, the Portuguese Armed and Security Forces organized and employed several other commando type forces in the Overseas Wars in Angola, Mozambique and Portuguese Guinea, including the Fuzileiros Especiais (Special Marines) of the Portuguese Navy, the Flechas (Arrows) of the International and State Defense Police and the Grupos Especiais (Special Groups) of the Government of Mozambique.

Russia

Russia has several units that can be listed under the commando distinction. The 45th Detached Reconnaissance Brigade is a special reconnaissance and special operations military unit within the Russian Airborne Troops, and based near Moscow and some of them continues operate in Private Paramilitary contractor such as Wagner Group. Other specialized Russian units include:

 Multiple Spetsnaz Units

Singapore
Singapore Armed Forces Commando Formation 1 CDO, 1st Commando Battalion

Somalia
Danab Brigade

Sri Lanka 

Sri Lanka Army Commando Regiment
1st Commando Regiment
2nd Commando Regiment
3rd Commando Regiment
4th Commando Regiment
HQ BN Commando(RFT)
Commando Regiment Training School Uva Kudaoya
Commando Regiment Specialized Warfare Training School at Vidathalathive Mannar
Anti Hijacking & Hostage Release Team' (AHHRT)

South Africa 
While the use of the word commando came to refer to various elite special operations forces units in other countries in the world, South Africa retained its original name as both a well regulated quick response militia as well as a special operations forces unit defined in the worldwide fashion. From the end of the 19th until the early 21st centuries, the Commando units in the form of its original structure were used in both urban and rural areas until the end of white rule in South Africa as part of a nationwide South African Commando System.

When white rule was replaced with majority rule, the new democratic ANC led government demanded the disbandment of the commandos which they considered an obstacle to further democratic control as well as complaints of abuses. Thus, with the integration of white cities with black townships, the new ANC led urban governments immediately disbanded the urban militia commando units.

With the election of Thabo Mbeki, the process of de-arming white militias again commenced and it was announced in 2003, that the rural commandos would be disbanded. The last rural commandos were ordered disbanded by the central government over constitutional arguments.

The ANC government directed its attention toward the Reconnaissance Commandos which were the first mixed-race unit in the old SADF. During the period of rationalisation, reorganisation and integration, some Reconnaissance Regiments (Numbers 1, 2, 3, 5 and 6) were disbanded and the members absorbed into the remaining 4 Special Forces Regiment (SFR) at Langebaan and 5 SFR at Phalaborwa as part of the 
South African Special Forces Brigade.

South Korea
The commando brigades are air assault Helicon unit, mainly responsible for clearing enemy special forces that have infiltrated the rear of the allies.
201st Special Assault Brigade
203rd Special Assault Brigade
In the case of commando regiments, it is a unit performing infiltration missions and air-operated warfare operations that begin with invasion of land and air.
700th Special Assault Regiment
701st Special Assault Regiment
702nd Special Assault Regiment
703rd Special Assault Regiment
705th Special Assault Regiment
706th Special Assault Regiment

Sweden
 31st Ranger Battalion
 Coastal rangers (Kustjägarna, KJ)

Thailand 
Air Force
Royal Thai Air Force Security Force Regiment
Royal Thai Air Force Special Operations Regiment also known as Air Force Commando

Turkey 
Turkish commandos typically wear blue berets. Commando brigades form the backbone of the Turkish Army's offensive capabilities, but they are not trained to conduct special operations, rather they serve as the main light infantry of the TAF. As of 2016, the number of commando brigades have been expanded to 16 to deal with the new threats, including two in the gendarmerie force brigade. These include:
1st Commando Brigade - specialized in airborne operations
2nd Commando Brigade
3rd Commando Brigade
4th Commando Brigade
5th Hakkari Mountain and Commando Brigade - specialized in mountain warfare
7th Commando Brigade
9th Commando Brigade
10th Commando Brigade
11th Commando Brigade
17th Commando Brigade
41st Commando Brigade 
49th Commando Brigade 
Amphibious Commando Brigade - specialized in amphibious warfare and amphibious reconnaissance
1st Gendarmerie Commando Brigade
2nd Gendarmerie Commando Brigade

The most notable are the 1st Commando Brigade and the 5th Hakkari Mountain and Commando Brigade. The Hakkari Mountain and Commando Brigade was founded as a subunit of the 1st Commando Brigade and is stationed in Hakkâri Province at south-easternmost Turkey. With the rise of the Kurdish insurgency, the existing formation has been enlarged from the size of a battalion to a brigade. The 1st Commando Brigade was involved in the Turkish invasion of Cyprus, and fought beside airborne commandos (Bolu) and the Naval Infantry Brigade (Izmir). In 1988, 7000 commandos received training from the United States.

United Kingdom 

3 Commando Brigade, Royal Marines is under the command of the Royal Navy's Commander-in-Chief Fleet.  All Royal Marines (other than those in the Royal Marines Band Service) are commando trained on entry to the Corps, with supporting units and individuals from the other armed services undertaking the All Arms Commando Course as required.

The Brigade is made up of 30 (IX) Commando, 40 Commando (home base: Taunton), 42 Commando (Bickleigh, South Hams, Plymouth), 43 Commando Fleet Protection Group (HMNB Clyde, Argyll and Bute), 45 Commando (Arbroath, Scotland), the Commando Logistic Regiment, the Royal Marines Armoured Support Group (Bovington Camp (Royal Armoured Corps Centre), Dorset), 539 Assault Squadron RM, 29 Commando Regiment Royal Artillery and 24 Commando Regiment Royal Engineers.

The Royal Marines is the largest force of its type in Europe and the second largest in NATO.

United States 

The United States continues to have no designated "commando" units; however, the closest equivalents remain the U.S. Army's 75th Ranger Regiment and United States Marine Corps Reconnaissance Battalions, which specialize in most of the same tasks and missions. The U.S. 75th Ranger Regiment is a light infantry, special operations unit of the United States Army. The regiment is headquartered at Fort Benning, Georgia and is composed of one special troops battalion and three ranger battalions. The regiment is the U.S. Army's premier raid force, with specialized skills that enable them to perform a variety of missions. These include direct action, airfield seizure, airborne and air assaults, special reconnaissance, personnel recovery, and high-value target raids. It operates as a special operations force under the United States Army Special Operations Command.

During the Vietnam War the U.S. Army's 5th Special Forces Group (Airborne) instituted, "Special Operations Augmentation Recondo School," an acronym for Reconnaissance Commando. The school was at Nha Trang Air Base, north of the massive U.S. Navy and Air Force Base at Cam Ranh Bay. Recondo School trained small, heavily armed long-range reconnaissance teams the art of patrolling deep in enemy-held territory. All students were combat veterans and came from the ranks of the U.S. Army, U.S. Marine Corps Force Recon Battalions, and the Army of the Republic of South Korea. The Army of the Republic of Vietnam had their own school.

Vietnam 

The North Vietnamese produced some of the most effective commando units (sometimes known as sappers) of the post World War II era. Called đặc công, these units represented a force economy measure for the NVA (North Vietnamese Army) and the Viet Cong. With large scale conventional attacks increasingly untenable, small commando operations came into their own, particularly after the Tet Offensive, and at times inflicted severe damage to US and ARVN troops and bases.

Commandos were originally supporting adjuncts to regular formations prior to 1967, but in time, independent formations were created throughout the Vietnam arena. Commandos could operate in support of a larger regular infantry formation, or as the main spearhead themselves, with regulars as backup. In the spearhead mode, they represented their most potent threat. A typical raiding operation was divided into 4 elements: Assault, Fire-Support, Security and Reserves. Assault teams were generally broken down into three-five man cells. Fire-support was critical, as it forced defenders to keep their heads down, while infiltrating assault elements made their final penetrations. One of the most devastating attacks was against the US Firebase, FSB Mary Ann in 1971. See chart for detailed breakdown of a typical commando raiding party. In addition, they also conducted a commando attack on the U.S. military airport in Thailand. The United States recorded a total of five attacks on airfields in Udorn, Ubon (three times) and Utapao. According to the United States the attack caused heavy damage to Udorn on a C-141, damage to some F-4s, minor damage to a helicopter HH-43. Attacks on Ubon destroyed 2 C-47 aircraft and a truck. At Utapao, a B-52 was damaged and two other B-52 bombers suffered minor damage. These are just a few examples out of many successful raids.

While small in terms of total men deployed throughout the Vietnam theater, commando attacks had a significant impact for the NLF/PAVN effort. As one US Army history puts it:

The modern era Vietnam Naval Commandos are better known as "đặc công nước".
Chinese sources believe that the Vietnam Naval Commandos just might be the best Special Forces unit in Asia.

The unit initially known as the 126 Frogmen Division or the "Naval Engineers Regiment 126" which was established in 1969. It is said that the Vietnam Naval Commandos sank multiple U.S. and Republic of Vietnam ships during the Vietnam war.  This Division was later known as the Brigade of Marines 126. Vietnam Naval Commandos supposedly have two brigades based in Long An and Khanh Hoa. Annually the division welcomes about 30-50 special elite frogmen. The Dac Cong Nuoc specialize in reconnaissance, ambushes, raids, assassinations, and demolitions.

Later in the Sino–Vietnamese War and a series of 1979–90 border war with China, Vietnamese commandos had raided into Chinese territory and destroyed many Chinese weapons and ammunition of the People's Liberation Army, which had concerned China over the Vietnamese commandos' sudden attacks. Also, it raised concerns of the abilities of Chinese military to protect its ammunition which was relatively not modernized and relied much on the other supplies.

Today, the Vietnamese Commando Forces remains as a military specific group which is comprised into the People's Army of Vietnam.

See also

Rhodesia 
During the Rhodesian Bush War of 1965–1980, the Rhodesian military increased its usage of commando type of operations in fighting against insurgents until the formation of Zimbabwe. In the Rhodesian Light Infantry a Commando was also the name given to its company sized units.

 Rhodesian Light Infantry
 Rhodesian Special Air Service
 Selous Scouts

References

Lists of military units and formations